Jeffrey Greenfield (born June 10, 1943) is an American television journalist and author.

Early life
He was born in New York City, to Benjamin and Helen Greenfield. He grew up in Manhattan and graduated in 1960 from the Bronx High School of Science. 

In 1964 he graduated with honors, obtaining a Bachelor of Arts degree from the University of Wisconsin–Madison, where he served as editor-in-chief of the Daily Cardinal. While at the university, Greenfield was inducted into the Iron Cross (Secret Society). 
In 1966, Greenfield graduated with honors with a Bachelor of Laws degree from Yale Law School, where he was a Note and Comment editor of the Yale Law Journal.

Career
Greenfield was hired as a speechwriter for Senator Robert F. Kennedy, assisting with RFK's speech, "On the Mindless Menace of Violence". He worked on the 1968 Presidential campaign of Kennedy. Greenfield worked as chief speechwriter for New York Mayor John Lindsay. 

Greenfield worked for seven years with political consultant David Garth.

Over the course of his career, Greenfield has reported primarily on domestic politics and the media, and occasionally on culture. He appeared on the Firing Line television program as early as 1968. He was the host of the national public television series "CEO Exchange," featuring in-depth interviews with high-profile chief executive officers, for five seasons. He served as media commentator for CBS News from 1979 to 1983 and as political and media analyst for ABC News from 1983 to 1997, often appearing on the Nightline program. He served as a senior analyst at CNN from 1998 to 2007. On May 1, 2007, Greenfield returned to CBS News, where he served as a senior political correspondent until April 2011. He hosted, May 7, 2010 to June 28, 2013, PBS's "Need to Know". He does political commentary on NBC Nightly News.

He has also written or contributed to 11 books and has written for Time, The New York Times, National Lampoon, Slate, and POLITICO Magazine. He wrote one novel, which is about the Electoral College.

Greenfield has received five Emmy Awards, two for his reporting from South Africa (1985 and 1990) and one for a profile of H. Ross Perot (1992). Then Everything Changed was a finalist for the 2011 Sidewise Award for Alternate History, Long Form.

Personal life
Greenfield has been married three times.
His first wife was Carrie Carmichael, whom he divorced in February 1993. They had two children: daughter Casey, and  son, David. Casey married screenwriter Matt Manfredi in 2004. 

On April 24, 1993, Greenfield married Karen Anne Gannett, from whom he is now divorced.
 In June 2002, he married Dena Sklar, a real estate broker. They live in Santa Barbara, California, and New York City.

Greenfield has seven grandchildren.

Books
with Jerry Bruno,

References

External links

 https://twitter.com/greenfield64/

1943 births
Living people
American alternate history writers
American television reporters and correspondents
20th-century American novelists
American male novelists
American speechwriters
Yale Law School alumni
News & Documentary Emmy Award winners
People from Salisbury, Connecticut
University of Wisconsin–Madison alumni
Jewish American novelists
Writers from Manhattan
The Bronx High School of Science alumni
ABC News personalities
CBS News people
PBS people
Novelists from New York (state)
American male non-fiction writers
20th-century American male writers
21st-century American Jews